The Kansas City Interscholastic (KCI) Conference is a mid-sized school athletic conference in the state of Missouri. It contains eight schools and holds many recent state titles in football, basketball and other sports. The schools in the KCI are classified as Missouri Class 2 and Missouri Class 3 by the Missouri State High School Activities Association.

Member schools

State Championships

Football
 Plattsburg 1979
 North Platte 1998
 West Platte 2001
 West Platte 2005
 Lawson 2007
 Penney 2009
 Penney 2010
 Penney 2012
 Penney 2016
 East Buchanan 2021

Softball
 Mid-Buchanan 1980
 Lathrop 2015

Boys Basketball
 Lathrop 1985

Girls Basketball
 Penney 1977
 Penney 2008
 East Buchanan 2020

Boys Track and Field
 East Buchanan 1974
 East Buchanan 2005

Girls Track and Field
 Penney 2007
 Penney 2008
 Penney 2009
 Penney 2010
 Penney 2011

Wrestling
 Mid-Buchanan 2021

References

Education in Kansas City, Missouri

Missouri high school athletic conferences
High school sports conferences and leagues in the United States